The Hundred of Cavenagh refers to a cadastral unit. It could be
 Hundred of Cavenagh (Northern Territory)
 Hundred of Cavenagh (South Australia)